William Shearer Stenger (February 13, 1840 – March 29, 1918) was an American Democratic Party politician.

William S. Stenger was born in Fort Loudon, Franklin County, Pennsylvania.   He graduated from Franklin & Marshall College in Lancaster, Pennsylvania, Class of 1858, where he was a Charter Member of the Zeta Chapter of the Chi Phi Fraternity.  He studied law, was admitted to the bar in 1860 and commenced practice in Chambersburg, Pennsylvania.  He served as executive director of the Philadelphia Record.  He was district attorney of Franklin County from 1862 to 1871.

Stenger was elected as a Democrat to the Forty-fourth and Forty-fifth Congresses.  He was an unsuccessful candidate for reelection in 1878.  He served as Secretary of the Commonwealth of Pennsylvania from 1883 to 1887.

He died in Philadelphia, Philadelphia County, Pennsylvania.

Interment at Falling Spring Presbyterian Church Cemetery, Chambersburg, Pennsylvania.

Sources

The Political Graveyard

External links
 

1840 births
1918 deaths
Pennsylvania lawyers
Politicians from Philadelphia
Franklin & Marshall College alumni
People from Chambersburg, Pennsylvania
Secretaries of the Commonwealth of Pennsylvania
Democratic Party members of the United States House of Representatives from Pennsylvania
19th-century American politicians
19th-century American lawyers